Omorgus salebrosus is a species of hide beetle in the subfamily Omorginae.

References

salebrosus
Beetles described in 1871